Papa M'Baye N'Diaye (born 11 May 1938) is a Senegalese sprinter. He competed in the 4 × 400 metres relay at the 1964 Summer Olympics and the 1968 Summer Olympics.

References

1938 births
Living people
Athletes (track and field) at the 1964 Summer Olympics
Athletes (track and field) at the 1968 Summer Olympics
Senegalese male sprinters
Senegalese male middle-distance runners
Olympic athletes of Senegal
Place of birth missing (living people)
African Games medalists in athletics (track and field)
African Games silver medalists for Senegal
Athletes (track and field) at the 1965 All-Africa Games
20th-century Senegalese people
21st-century Senegalese people